The Joy of Flying is a jazz fusion album by Tony Williams. It was recorded at the end of The Tony Williams Lifetime years, and is considered his first solo album since 1966. It includes three duets, two with Mahavishnu Orchestra keyboardist Jan Hammer, and one with free jazz pianist Cecil Taylor, and three different quartets: the first featured Hammer along with guitarist George Benson and bassist
Paul Jackson, the second featured pianist Herbie Hancock, bassist Stanley Clarke and Tom Scott on Lyricon, and the third featured guitarist Ronnie Montrose, keyboardist Brian Auger, and bass guitarist Mario Cipollina. "Hip Skip" also featured a five piece horn section.

The third quartet mentioned above performed a single concert on July 27, 1978 at Japan's Denen Coliseum 
(billed as "The Tony Williams All Stars"), which was recorded. Their set list included "Rocky Road" and "Heads Up" by Montrose, "Red Alert", "Wildlife" and "There Comes a Time" by Williams, "Dragon Song" by John McLaughlin, and "Tropic of Capricorn" (with special guest drummer Billy Cobham).

Track listing
 "Going Far" (Jan Hammer) - 4:13
 "Hip Skip" (George Benson) - 8:03
 "Hittin' on 6" (Tom Scott) - 6:16
 "Open Fire" (Ronnie Montrose, Edgar Winter) - 6:16
 "Tony" (Stanley Clarke) - 6:50 
 "Eris" (Hammer) - 3:33
 "Coming Back Home" (Hammer) - 6:06
 "Morgan's Motion" (Cecil Taylor) - 8:18

Personnel

(adapted from the original LP notes)

Tony Williams - drums & percussion (all tracks)
Jan Hammer (tracks 1, 2, 6 & 7), Herbie Hancock (tracks 3 & 5) - electric pianos & synthesizers
George Benson (tracks 2 & 7), Ronnie Montrose (track 4) - electric guitars
Tom Scott - Lyricon (tracks 3 & 5)
Cecil Taylor - acoustic piano (track 8)
Ralph MacDonald - percussion (track 2)
Paul Jackson (tracks 2 & 7), Stanley Clarke (tracks 3 & 5) - bass guitars

Horn Section (track 2):
David Sanborn - alto saxophone
Michael Brecker - tenor saxophone
Ronnie Cuber - baritone saxophone
Jon Faddis & Randy Brecker - trumpets
Barry Rogers - trombone

Production

Produced by Tony Williams

Recording engineers:
Jan Hammer (tracks 1 & 6); Don Puluse (tracks 2 & 7);
Fred Catero (tracks 3 & 5); Tom Suzuki (track 4);
Stan Tonkel (track 8)

References

Tony Williams; "Joy Of Flying" liner notes; Columbia Records 1978

1978 albums
Columbia Records albums
Tony Williams (drummer) albums